The year 2001 was the 30th year after the independence of Bangladesh. It was also the fifth and final year of the first term of the Government of Sheikh Hasina and the first year of the third term of the Government of Khaleda Zia.

Incumbents

 President: Shahabuddin Ahmed (until 14 November), A. Q. M. Badruddoza Chowdhury (starting 14 November)
 Prime Minister:
 until 15 July: Sheikh Hasina
 15 July – 10 October: Latifur Rahman
 starting 10 October: Khaleda Zia
 Chief Justice: Latifur Rahman (until 28 February), Mahmudul Amin Choudhury (starting 1 March)

Demography

Climate

Economy

Note: For the year 2001 average official exchange rate for BDT was 55.81 per US$.

Events
 1 January – Bangladesh High Court bans religious edicts (Fatwa).
 20 January – A terrorist grenade attack on a rally of Communist Party of Bangladesh in Paltan Maidan, Dhaka leaves 5 killed and dozens injured.
 14 April – Eight people are killed in bomb blast at a Bengali New Year concert in Dhaka.
 18 April – Sixteen Indian and three Bangladeshi soldiers killed in their worst border clashes.
 30 April – High Court confirms death sentences on 12 ex-army officers for killing Mujib. Only four are in custody.
 1 June – A bomb exploded at Gopalganj Roman Catholic church resulting in the death of 10 people and the injury of 26 people.
 16 June – a bomb attack at a meeting of Bangladesh Awami League in Narayanganj resulted in the death of 22 people.
 26 August – 50,000 people are marooned by flash flooding.
 23 September – A bomb attack at an Awami League election rally led by Member of Parliament Sheikh Helal Uddin in Bagerhat District resulted in the death of 9 people.
 1 October – The Eighth National Parliamentary Elections 2001 were held under the supervision of a  caretaker government led by the Chief Adviser Justice Latifur Rahman. Bangladesh Nationalist Party turned out as the winner.
 10 October – Khaleda Zia is sworn in as Prime minister of Bangladesh following a landslide election victory. Violence towards religious minorities reported.

Awards and recognitions

Independence Day Award

Ekushey Padak
 The Mother Language Lovers Of The World, for its contribution to the declaration of 21 February as International Mother Language Day
 Foni Borua, music
 Shyamoli Nasrin Chowdhury, education
 Nirmalendu Goon, literature
 Zia Haider, literature
 Rafiqul Islam, education
 Binoy Bashi Joldas, instrumental music
 Shah Abdul Karim, folk song
 Abdul Matin, Language Movement
 Golam Mustafa, film
 Ataur Rahman, drama
 Mahadev Saha, literature

Sports
 International football:
 Bangladesh participated in the Millennium Soccer Super Cup held in India from 10 to 25 January 2001. They did not win any match in the competition.
 Domestic football:
 Mohammedan SC won the National Championship while Abahani KC came out runner-up.
 Muktijoddha SKC won Bangladesh Federation Cup.
 Cricket:
 The Bangladesh national team toured Zimbabwe and played 2 Test matches and 3 One Day Internationals in April 2001. Bangladesh lost all 5 matches.
 Bangladesh participated in 2001 Asian Test Championship tournament held in Sri Lanka and Pakistan in August 2001. Bangladesh lost their matches against both hosts.
 Bangladesh hosted Zimbabwe for a 2 Test and 3 One Day International tour in November 2001 before travelling to New Zealand in December 2001 for a 2 Test series. Zimbabwe won four out of the five matches with one of the Test matches resulting in a draw. New Zealand won both test matches.

Births
 1 January - Krishna Rani, footballer

Deaths

 9 February – M Amirul Islam, scientist (b. 1918)
 10 July – Humayun Rashid Choudhury, diplomat (b. 1928)
 28 July – Ahmed Sofa, writer, poet (b. 1943)
 30 August – A. F. M. Ahsanuddin Chowdhury, justice and former president (b. 1915)

See also 
 2000s in Bangladesh
 List of Bangladeshi films of 2001
 Timeline of Bangladeshi history

References

 
Bangladesh
Bangladesh